Vrabcha Cove is the 900 m wide cove indenting for 1 km the west coast of Heywood Island off the northwest coast of Robert Island in the South Shetland Islands, Antarctica.

The cove is named after the settlement of Vrabcha in western Bulgaria.

Location
Bulgarian mapping in 2009.

Map
 L.L. Ivanov. Antarctica: Livingston Island and Greenwich, Robert, Snow and Smith Islands. Scale 1:120000 topographic map.  Troyan: Manfred Wörner Foundation, 2009.

References
 Vrabcha Cove. SCAR Composite Gazetteer of Antarctica.
 Bulgarian Antarctic Gazetteer. Antarctic Place-names Commission. (details in Bulgarian, basic data in English)

External links
 Vrabcha Cove. Copernix satellite image

Coves of Robert Island
Bulgaria and the Antarctic